A state legislative assembly (DUN; also known simply as state assembly) is the legislative branch of the state governments in each of the 13 Malaysian states. Members of a state legislative assembly comprises elected representatives from single-member constituencies during state elections through the first-past-the-post system.

The assemblies have powers to enact state laws as provided for by the Constitution of Malaysia. The majority party in each assembly forms the state government, and the leader of the majority party becomes Menteri Besar (for states with hereditary rulers) or Chief Minister (for states without hereditary rulers) of the state.

The state legislative assemblies are unicameral, unlike the bicameral Parliament of Malaysia. The hereditary rulers or Yang di-Pertua Negeri (governors) are vested with powers to dissolve their respective state legislative assemblies on the advice of the menteri besar or chief minister. Once dissolved, elections must be carried out within an interim period of sixty (60) days. Usually, state elections are held simultaneously with the federal parliamentary elections, with the exception of Sarawak, Sabah, Melaka and 
Johor.

List of state legislative assemblies in Malaysia
The list excludes Kuala Lumpur, Putrajaya and Labuan as Federal Territories do not have state legislative assemblies and are governed directly by the federal government under the Ministry of Federal Territories together with local authorities, namely the Kuala Lumpur City Hall, Putrajaya Corporation and Labuan Corporation respectively.

Lists of State Assembly Representatives in Malaysia

 List of Malayan State and Settlement Council Representatives (1954–59)
 List of Malaysian State Assembly Representatives (1959–64)
 List of Malaysian State Assembly Representatives (1964–69)
 List of Malaysian State Assembly Representatives (1969–74)
 List of Malaysian State Assembly Representatives (1974–78)
 List of Malaysian State Assembly Representatives (1978–82)
 List of Malaysian State Assembly Representatives (1982–86)
 List of Malaysian State Assembly Representatives (1986–90)
 List of Malaysian State Assembly Representatives (1990–95)
 List of Malaysian State Assembly Representatives (1995–99)
 List of Malaysian State Assembly Representatives (1999–2004)
 List of Malaysian State Assembly Representatives (2004–08)
 List of Malaysian State Assembly Representatives (2008–13)
 List of Malaysian State Assembly Representatives (2013–18)
 List of Malaysian State Assembly Representatives (2018–22)

Women
Women in state legislative assemblies of Malaysia

See also 

 Politics of Malaysia
 List of state by-elections in Malaysia

Notes

References 

Politics of Malaysia